The Tismana is a right tributary of the river Jiu in Romania. It discharges into the Jiu near Șomănești. The 4 km long reach of the river, upstream of the Tismana Monastery is also known as Dorna.

Tributaries

The following rivers are tributaries to the river Tismana (from source to mouth):

Left: Crișanu, Tismănița, Valea lui Mareș, Sohodol, Câlnic, Icazna, Bistrița, Jaleș
Right: Crișanu Nou, Păltinei, Geamănu, Gramna, Dosu Cioclovinei, Schitului, Cioclovina, Sașa, Orlea, Peșteana, Strâmba

See also
Lake Ceauru (project)

References

Rivers of Romania
Rivers of Gorj County